Both Llantysilio Mountain and Maesyrchen Mountain re-direct here.

Moel y Gamelin is a hill in Denbighshire, North Wales, to the northwest of the town of Llangollen. The western part of the range is known as Llantysilio Mountain whilst the eastern end is referred to as Maesyrchen Mountain. It is in the Clwydian Range and Dee Valley Area of Outstanding Natural Beauty.

References

Mountains and hills of Denbighshire
Marilyns of Wales